William Ronald Smith  (August 13, 1926 – February 9, 1998), known professionally as William Ronald, was an important Canadian painter, best known as the founder of the influential Canadian abstract art group Painters Eleven in 1953 and for his abstract expressionist "central image" paintings. He was the older brother of painter John Meredith (1933–2000).

Career

William Ronald was born in Stratford, Ontario, but he and his family moved to Fergus, Ontario where his father worked as a market gardener. When he was in his teens, he and his family moved to Brampton, Ontario. He attended the Ontario College of Art in Toronto, graduating in 1951. He worked as a display designer for the Robert Simpson Co. department store, starting in 1952. At the same time, he had begun to exhibit his abstract work with the Canadian Society of Painters in Water Colour, Ontario Society of Artists, the Canadian Group of Painters, the Royal Canadian Academy, and elsewhere. During these exhibitions he met other abstract artists such as Ray Mead. At Simpsons in 1953, he persuaded management to pair abstract paintings with furniture displays in store windows (it was called the Abstracts at Home show and used the work of Ronald and his friends). He thereby discovered a way to get the public to accept non-representational art. With artist friends of a like mind, he founded Painters Eleven in 1953, the first abstract painting group in Ontario. Despite the success of the group, Ronald resented the city's general attitude toward its artists and moved to the United States in 1957, eventually becoming an American citizen. Ronald joined the stable of artists at Manhattan's Kootz Gallery, where he was put on retainer. He was accepted by critics, collectors, and artists such as Franz Kline, and enjoyed a multi-year period of success. Eventually, Ronald returned to Toronto, as a landed immigrant in the country of his birth, partly due to changing trends in the art market and partly because he could not get along with Kootz. In 1969, he painted a mural for the National Arts Centre, Ottawa. He was made a member of the Royal Canadian Academy of Arts in 1975.

Besides painting, he became known as a CBC (Canadian Broadcasting Corporation) journalist, hosting such shows as The Umbrella beginning in 1966 and As It Happens (1969-1972), a columnist for the Toronto Telegram, and host of a Citytv variety show. He continued to paint through the 1970s, '80s and '90s, moving to Montreal, Quebec, and then to Barrie, Ontario where he maintained a studio. He gained some notoriety for his portrait series of Canadian Prime Ministers, a pioneering highly abstracted portrayal of heads of government opened by Prime Minister Pierre Trudeau in Toronto in 1984 at the Art Gallery of Ontario. The exhibition toured Canada, despite warnings not to exhibit the less than flattering portrait of then Prime Minister Brian Mulroney. They are currently part of the permanent collection of the Kitchener-Waterloo Art Gallery in Kitchener, Ontario. Never a stranger to criticism or polemics, Ronald loved to paint in public, frequently hiring strippers and showgirls to dance around him as he painted. He continued to paint until his death in 1998 and in fact suffered a heart attack while painting Untitled. He succumbed a few days later.

Selected exhibitions
 1957-1960, 1962-1963: Kootz Gallery, NYC
 1960: Laing Galleries, Toronto
 1963: Isaacs Gallery, Toronto
 1963: Princeton University Art Gallery
 1965: David Mirvish Gallery, Toronto
 1971: Tom Thomson Memorial Art Gallery, Owen Sound, Ontario
 1975: Robert McLaughlin Gallery, Oshawa, Ontario
 1975, 1977-1980: Morris Gallery, Toronto
 1984: Art Gallery of Ontario, Toronto

Selected collections
 Albright Knox Art Gallery, Buffalo
 Art Gallery of Ontario, Toronto
 Art Institute of Chicago
 Brooklyn Museum, New York
 Guggenheim Museum, New York (purchased Earth, 1954, in 1958)
 Hirshhorn Museum, Smithsonian Institution, Washington
 Musée national des beaux-arts du Québec, Québec
 Museum of Modern Art, New York
 National Gallery of Canada, Ottawa
 Robert McLaughlin Gallery, Oshawa
 Whitney Museum of Art, New York

Awards
 I.O.D.E. Scholarship, Canada (1951); 
 Hallmark Art Award, NYC (1952);
 Canadian Amateur Hockey Assoc. Art Scholarship (1954);
 National Award, Canadian Section, International Guggenheim Awards (1956);
 2nd Biennial Exhibition of Canadian Painting, NGC, Ott. (1957); 
 Canada Council Senior Arts Award (1977)

Notes

Bibliography
 
 
 

  Exhibition catalogue.
 Index of Paintings 1949-1962, William Ronald Fonds, Library and Archives Canada, Ottawa.

External links
 National Gallery of Canada (William Ronald)

20th-century Canadian painters
Canadian male painters
Modern painters
Abstract expressionist artists
Canadian television hosts
1926 births
1998 deaths
20th-century Canadian male artists
Artists from Ontario
People from Stratford, Ontario
Canadian muralists
Members of the Royal Canadian Academy of Arts
Canadian abstract artists